Matt Riggio (born 14 March 1988) is an Australian rules footballer who recently played for the North Melbourne (the Kangaroos) in the Australian Football League (AFL).  Riggio was a second round draft selection, number 28 overall, in the 2005 AFL Draft.  He had previously played with West Australian Football League (WAFL) club Peel Thunder and is now currently playing for Swan Districts in the WAFL. 

Riggio made his debut for North Melbourne in the opening round of the 2007 AFL season, but after also playing the following week, he wasn't selected again until Round 8 of the 2008 season.  He played seven consecutive games in 2008 before again being dropped for round 15, playing out the remainder of the season with the Kangaroos' Victorian Football League (VFL) affiliated team, the Werribee Tigers.

Continues to be a dominant midfielder in the WAFL for Swan Districts and has represented WA in state football. Riggio won the Swan Medal for the fairest and best player at the club in 2015 and 2016.

Notes

External links

North Melbourne Football Club players
Peel Thunder Football Club players
Living people
1988 births
Australian rules footballers from Western Australia
Swan Districts Football Club players
Werribee Football Club players
People from Peel (Western Australia)